Anna Koorders-Schumacher (1870-1934) was a German-born Dutch botanist.  She was married to Dutch botanist Sijfert Hendrik Koorders, with whom she co-authored books on Javanese plants

Written works

References

1870 births
1934 deaths
Dutch women scientists
20th-century Dutch botanists
People from Ahrweiler (district)
20th-century Dutch women